Alpha Columbae or α Columbae, officially named Phact, is a third magnitude star in the southern constellation of Columba. It has an apparent visual magnitude of 2.6, making it the brightest member of Columba.

Nomenclature 
α Columbae, Latinized to Alpha Columbae, is the star's Bayer designation.

The traditional name of Phact (also rendered Phad, Phaet, Phakt) derives from the Arabic فاختة fākhitah 'ring dove'.  It was originally applied to the constellation Cygnus and later transferred to this star.  The etymology of its name hadāri (unknown meaning) has also been suggested. In 2016, the International Astronomical Union organized a Working Group on Star Names (WGSN) to catalog and standardize proper names for stars. The WGSN's first bulletin of July 2016 included a table of the first two batches of names approved by the WGSN; which included Phact for this star.

From this Chinese name, the name Chang Jin has appeared

Properties 
This is believed to be a solitary star, although it has a faint optical companion at an angular separation of 13.5 arcseconds, making it a double star. The stellar classification of Alpha Columbae is B9Ve, matching a B-type main-sequence star. The spectrum shows it to be a Be star surrounded by a hot gaseous disk, which is generating emission lines because of hydrogen recombination. The azimuthal equatorial velocity may be . It is a suspected Gamma Cassiopeiae type (GCAS) variable star, with its apparent magnitude varying from 2.62m to 2.66m.

References

B-type main-sequence stars
Be stars

Columba (constellation)
Columbae, Alpha
Durchmusterung objects
037795
026634
1956
Phact